Robert Squire (born April 1, 1990 in Salt Lake City) is an American cyclist riding for Hincapie Racing.

American is third overall at USA Pro Challenge after four stages

Major results
2010
3rd Pan American Games Cross-country
2011
 National U23 Road Race Champion

References

External links
 
 
 

1990 births
Living people
American male cyclists